Gogodipterus is an extinct genus of prehistoric lungfish in the family Chirodipteridae. It was discovered ar the Late Devonian Gogo Formation of  Western Australia.

See also

 Sarcopterygii
 List of sarcopterygians
 List of prehistoric bony fish

References

Prehistoric lobe-finned fish genera